The Last Straw is a 1937 comedy play by the British writers Reginald Denham and Edward Percy.

It's London premiere was at the Comedy Theatre in the West End, running for 52 performances between 29 September 13 November 1937. The original cast included Richard Haydn, Marius Goring, Andre Morell, Tom Gill, Arthur Hambling, Lucie Mannheim and Anna Konstam.

References

Bibliography
 Wearing, J.P. The London Stage 1930-1939: A Calendar of Productions, Performers, and Personnel.  Rowman & Littlefield, 2014.

1937 plays
Comedy plays
West End plays
Plays by Edward Percy Smith
Plays by Reginald Denham